Trudy Dittmar (born 1944) is an American nature writer and essayist.

Life
She is the daughter of George Julius and Florence G. Dittmar. Her work appeared in North Dakota Quarterly, High Plains Literary Review, and North American Review.

She lives in Dubois, Wyoming.

Awards
 2003 Whiting Award
 2000 Rona Jaffe Foundation Writers' Award

Works
"Moose", The North American Review, September/ October 1996

Anthologies
 
 
 
 The Norton Book of Nature Writing, John Elder, Robert Finch (Eds.),

References

External links
Profile at The Whiting Foundation
"Reviews", Lisa Couturier

1944 births
American non-fiction writers
American essayists
Living people
Rona Jaffe Foundation Writers' Award winners
People from Dubois, Wyoming